Lollywood refers to Pakistan's film industry based in Lahore, previously the base for both Punjabi and Urdu language film production.

Lahore has been the center of Pakistani cinema since the partition of India in 1947. However, with Urdu film hub largely shifting to Karachi by 2007, film industry in Lahore became synonymous with Pakistani Punjabi film Industry.

The word "Lollywood" is a portmanteau of "Lahore" and "Hollywood", coined in 1989 by Glamour magazine gossip columnist Saleem Nasir, and is usually used comparatively with respect to other film industries in South Asian cinema.

Etymology 

"Lollywood" is a portmanteau derived from Lahore and "Hollywood", a shorthand reference for the American film industry, Hollywood.

History 

Prior to the 1947 partition of India into the Republic of India and Pakistan, the Lahore film industry was initially part of the British Raj era cinema of India. The Bombay cinema industry (now known as Hindi cinema or "Bollywood" in modern India) was closely linked to the Lahore film industry, as both produced films in the Hindustani language, also known as Hindi-Urdu, the lingua franca of northern and central British India. Many actors, filmmakers and musicians from the Lahore industry migrated to the Bombay industry during the 1940s, including actors K. L. Saigal, Prithviraj Kapoor, Dilip Kumar and Dev Anand as well as playback singers Mohammed Rafi, Noorjahan and Shamshad Begum. After the 1947 partition and the foundation of Pakistan, the Lahore film industry transitioned to becoming the centre of the new Pakistani cinema.

Films 

Lollywood films in Punjabi were most popular in the 1960s and are often referred to as the golden age of Pakistani Punjabi cinema.

Casts and crews

See also 

 List of Pakistani films
 List of Urdu-language films
 Lists of Pakistani films by language
 List of Pakistani animated films
 List of highest-grossing films in Pakistan
 Central Board of Film Censors
 List of films banned in Pakistan

References

Bibliography 
 South Asian Media Cultures: Audiences, Representations, Contexts. United Kingdom, Anthem Press, 2011.

External links 
 Search Punjabi films @ IMDB.com

 
Cinema of Pakistan
 
Punjabi language
1980s neologisms
Film production districts